Trizogeniates is a genus of beetles in the family Scarabaeidae.

Species
 Trizogeniates beckeri Ferriera, Bravo, Grossi & Seidel, 2019
 Trizogeniates cribricollis (Lucas, 1859)
 Trizogeniates curvatus Ferriera, Bravo, Grossi & Seidel, 2019
 Trizogeniates dispar (Burmeister, 1844)
 Trizogeniates eliskae Ferriera, Bravo, Grossi & Seidel, 2019
 Trizogeniates eris 
 Trizogeniates goyanus Ohaus, 1917
 Trizogeniates hallensorum Ferriera, Bravo, Grossi & Seidel, 2019
 Trizogeniates laevis (Camerano, 1878)
 Trizogeniates montanus Ohaus, 1917
 Trizogeniates spatulatus Ferriera, Bravo, Grossi & Seidel, 2019
 Trizogeniates temporalis Ohaus, 1917
 Trizogeniates terricolus Ohaus, 1917
 Trizogeniates vazdemelloi Ferriera, Bravo, Grossi & Seidel, 2019
 Trizogeniates vittatus (Lucas, 1859)
 Trizogeniates zuzanae Ferriera, Bravo, Grossi & Seidel, 2019

References

Scarabaeidae genera